Tom Whyman is an academic philosopher and writer. Whyman is a freelance writer and teaches philosophy part-time at the University of Durham. He has undertaken studies in the following fields: Frankfurt School critical theory, German idealism, Kierkegaard, and contemporary ethical naturalism.

Whyman was born in Frimley, Surrey, and currently lives in Gateshead.

He published 'Infinitely Full of Hope: Fatherhood and the Future in an Age of Crisis and Disaster', which discusses the philosophy of hope and despair, in relation to parenthood and the upcoming birth of his child.

Books
Infinitely Full of Hope: Fatherhood and the Future in an Age of Crisis and Disaster, Repeater Books: ISBN 9781913462253

The German Ideology: A New Abridgement, Repeater Books: ISBN 978-1913462956

References

Living people
Frankfurt School
Year of birth missing (living people)
Academics of the University of Essex
German idealism
21st-century English philosophers
21st-century English male writers